Vaiyāvik Kōpperum Pēgan was a Tamil Vēlir king and one of the kadai ezhu vallal of arts and literature during the Sangam era. He was the lord of the Āviyar clan of Vēls, a contemporary of poet Paranar, and was known for his lavish gifts and kindness. The Āviyar line of Vēls ruled over the area around Palani hills and bore the title Vēl Āvi.

An act of kindness

According to tradition, once when Pēkan was going around his country, he sees a peacock shivering in the rain and cloaks it with his gold laced silk robe; (Purananuru, song 145 of Paranar):

Squanderer of wealth but a warrior nevertheless

Pēkan was a patron of not only bards but was known to bestow lavish gifts on just about anyone who visited his court. This incited his court poet Paranar who mocks that his patron was ignorant to the point of being foolish when it came to giving away gifts but at the same time was not so ignorant in battle; (Purananuru-song 142):

Infidelity

Pēkan was a philanderer and was unfaithful towards his virtuous wife who is often compared to Kannaki, the goddess pattini of Silapathikaram. He indulges in dancing women in Nallur(near present day Tuticorin in Tamil Nadu) and abandons his wife at which point the latter seeks the help of various poets to bring him back home. Even though he was king, the poets rally behind his wife and question his actions while urging him to return home:

Purananuru, an excerpt of song (143) by Kapilar:

Purananuru, an excerpt of song (145) by Paranar:

Purananuru, an excerpt of song (146) by AricilKilār:

Purananuru, an excerpt of song (147) by PerunkunrurKilār:

Even though tradition paints a rosy picture that Pēkan finally came to his senses, in reality there is no evidence that the king corrected his erring ways and returned to his virtuous queen.

See also
 Purananuru

Notes

References
 Historical heritage of the Tamils By Ca. Vē Cuppiramaṇiyan̲, Ka. Ta Tirunāvukkaracu, International Institute of Tamil Studies
 The Four Hundred Songs of War and Wisdom: An Anthology of Poems from Classical Tamil, the Purananuru By George L. Hart, Hank Heifetz
 A handbook of Kerala By T. Madhava Menon, International School of Dravidian Linguistics
 Volume 3 of Encyclopaedia of Tamil Literature, Institute of Asian Studies (Madras, India)
 The Chronology of the Early Tamils - Based on the Synchronistic Tables of Their Kings, Chieftains and Poets Appearing in the Sangam Literature By Sivaraja Pillai

Tamil monarchs
Indian philanthropists
Year of death unknown
Kadai ezhu vallal
Year of birth unknown